Fayssal Bazzi is an Australian actor. He was nominated for the 2018 AACTA Award for Best Actor in a Supporting Role for his role in The Merger and again in 2020 for Measure for Measure.

Filmography
Television
Shantaram (2022) - Abdullah Taheri (12 episodes)
Stateless (2020) - Ameer (6 episodes)
Mr Inbetween (2019) - Nasir (1 episode)
Rake (2018) - Mr. Ahmad (1 episode)
Chosen (2018) - Fixer (3 episodes)
The Letdown (2017) - Tony (1 episode)
Wake in Fright (2017) - Donald (1 episode)
Top of the Lake (2017) - Cop Thommo (1 episode)
Tough Nuts: Australia's Hardest Criminals (2011) - Dino Dibra (1 episode)
Crownies (2011) - Mustafa Al-Tikriti (1 episode)
The Strip (2008) - Joe Abadi (2 episodes)
Double the Fist (2008) - Evil Clown (1 episode)
All Saints (2008) - Tim Spilane (1 episode)
Stupid Stupid Man (2008) - Daniel (1 episode)
East West 101 (2007) - Ali (1 episode)
Film
Measure for Measure (2019) - Farouk
The Merger (2018) - Sayyid
Peter Rabbit (2018) - Mr. Tod (voice)
6 Days (2017) - Makki
Down Under (2016) - D-Mac
Cedar Boys (2009) - Spike
Emulsion (2006) - Taxi Driver
Geoffrey Bagel (2006) - Thug 1

References

External links
 

1982 births
Living people
21st-century Australian male actors
Australian male film actors
Australian male television actors
Australian people of Lebanese descent